Tina Svensson Grønlund (born 16 November 1966, in Levanger) is a former Norwegian footballer, world champion and Olympic medalist.

She debuted for the Norwegian national team in 1990, and played 57 matches for the national team.

She received a bronze medal at the 1996 Summer Olympics in Atlanta.

References

External links

1966 births
Living people
Norwegian women's footballers
Footballers at the 1996 Summer Olympics
Olympic footballers of Norway
Olympic bronze medalists for Norway
Olympic medalists in football
1991 FIFA Women's World Cup players
1995 FIFA Women's World Cup players
Toppserien players
Asker Fotball (women) players
Norway women's international footballers
FIFA Women's World Cup-winning players
Norwegian people of Swedish descent
Medalists at the 1996 Summer Olympics
UEFA Women's Championship-winning players
Women's association footballers not categorized by position
People from Levanger
Sportspeople from Trøndelag